P. divisa  may refer to:

 Pinara divisa, the common pinara, a moth species found in the south-east quarter of Australia
 Platypleura divisa, a cicada species found in Africa

See also
 Divisa (disambiguation)